James Lawrence (1781–1813) was an American naval officer.

James Lawrence may also refer to:
James Lawrence (cricketer, born 1976), English cricketer, played for Durham in 1995 and British Universities in 1998
James Lawrence (New Zealand cricketer) (1867–1946), New Zealand cricketer, played for Canterbury and New Zealand
James Lawrence (Wellington cricketer) (1849-1898), New Zealand cricketer
James Lawrence (Cambridgeshire cricketer) (1785–?), English cricketer
James Lawrence (footballer) (born 1992), Wales international footballer
James Lawrence (Ohio politician) (1851–1914), Democratic politician from the state of Ohio
James Lawrence (triathlete), American triathlete
James Lawrence (rower) (1907–1995), American rower
Sir James Lawrence, 1st Baronet (1820–1897), British Member of Parliament for Lambeth, 1865 and 1868–1885
James Duncan Lawrence (author) (1918-1994), U.S. author
James E. Lawrence (1882–1941), American football player
James F. Lawrence Jr. (1918–2006), American Marine Corps Navy Cross recipient, lawyer
James H. Lawrence, member of the California legislature
James Henry Lawrence (1773–1840), British writer
James M. Lawrence (born 1946), magazine publisher
Jamie Lawrence (footballer, born 1970), Jamaican footballer
Jamie Lawrence (MuggleCast)

See also
Jim Lawrence (disambiguation)